The Ascension of Christ (also known as Sansepolcro Altarpiece; Italian: Pala di Sansepolcro) is a painting by Italian Renaissance master Perugino, dating from around 1510. It is housed in the Cathedral of Sansepolcro, Tuscany, central Italy.

Description
The works adopts the same composition in the central panel of Perugino's San Pietro Polyptych. However, due to the greater sizes, he enhanced some decorative details, such as the ribbons held by the angels. The work also saw a massive collaboration of the artist's workshop.

Christ is portrayed within an almond hovering at the top center of the panel, surrounded by flying or playing angels, while the frame has heads of cherubims  and seraphims. The lower group includes Mary and the Apostles, with an Umbrian landscape in the background, characterized by slender trees.

Sources

1510 paintings
Angels in art
Paintings by Pietro Perugino
Perugino
Paintings of the Virgin Mary
Paintings in Sansepolcro
Musical instruments in art
Altarpieces